The Australian Basketball Hall of Fame was instituted by the National Basketball League (NBL) in 1998 as the NBL Hall of Fame as part of their 20th season celebrations. The NBL initiated the Hall of Fame to recognise the outstanding players, coaches, referees and contributors to the league. In 2010, the NBL Hall of Fame united with the Basketball Australia Hall of Fame to create the 'Australian Basketball Hall of Fame'.

To be eligible for induction into the Hall of Fame, NBL candidates must have fulfilled the following criteria:
 Players must have made an outstanding contribution to the NBL, have been retired for a minimum of four seasons, and have played 100 NBL games or more.
 Coaches must have made an outstanding contribution to the NBL, have been retired for at least four seasons, and have been an NBL head coach for 10 seasons or more.
 Referees must have made an outstanding contribution to the league and have been retired for at least four seasons.
 Contributors must have made an outstanding contribution to the NBL, and may be elected at any time.

As of June 2022, the Australian Basketball Hall of Fame has six members with legend status: Alistair Ramsay, Betty Watson, John Raschke, Lindsay Gaze, Michele Timms and Andrew Gaze.

Inductees

References

External links
 Hall of Fame inductees list @ Basketball Australia's website

National Basketball League (Australia)
Basketball museums and halls of fame
Basketball in Australia
Basketball Hall of Fame
Awards established in 1998
Halls of fame in Australia
1998 establishments in Australia
Basketball in Australia lists